John Heyl Vincent (February 23, 1832 – May 9, 1920) was an American bishop of the  Methodist Episcopal Church.

He was born at Tuscaloosa, Ala., and was educated at Lewisburg (Pa.) Academy and at Wesleyan Institute, Newark, N. J.  He entered the New Jersey Conference in 1853, and was transferred to the Rock River Conference in 1857.  He was pastor of churches in Chicago and established the Northwest Sunday-School Quarterly (1865) and the Sunday-School Teacher (1866).  He was corresponding secretary of the Sunday-school Union of his denomination and editor of its publications (1868–1884).  In 1888, he was elected Bishop and was appointed Resident Bishop in Europe in 1900, stationed at Zurich, Switzerland; in 1904, he retired from the active episcopate. He was a co-founder of the Chautauqua Assembly (1874), and chancellor of Chautauqua Institution from its organization (1878).  He published:  
The Chautauqua Movement (1886)
The Church School and Its Officers (1886)
Studies in Young Life (1890)
A Study in Pedagogy (1890)
Earthly Footsteps of the Man of Galilee (1894)
Family Worship for Every Day in the Year (1905)

Sources

External links

1832 births
1920 deaths
American educators
American educational theorists
People from Tuscaloosa, Alabama
People from Chicago
American Methodist bishops
19th-century American theologians
Editors of Christian publications
Chautauqua Institution
American expatriates in Switzerland
19th-century American Methodist ministers
20th-century American writers
19th-century American educators
Methodists from Alabama
Methodists from Illinois
Methodist theologians
20th-century American theologians